Xanthophyllum brachystachyum is a tree in the family Polygalaceae. The specific epithet  is from the Greek meaning "short spike", referring to the shortness of the inflorescence.

Description
The smooth bark is grey-green or whitish. The flowers are purplish, drying orange-brown.

Distribution and habitat
Xanthophyllum brachystachyum is endemic to Borneo.

References

brachystachyum
Endemic flora of Borneo
Trees of Borneo
Plants described in 2005